The 2021 NextEra Energy 250 was a NASCAR Camping World Truck Series race held on February 12, 2021. Contested over 101 laps due to an overtime finish, on the  asphalt superspeedway. It was the first race of the 2021 NASCAR Camping World Truck Series season. Ben Rhodes of ThorSport Racing would win the race passing Cory Roper on the final lap.

Entry list

Practice 

Qualifying 

Tim Viens would not set a time after his car's driveshaft fell off the car as the team was pushing the car onto pit road, causing him to not qualify for the race.

Qualifying results

Race

Race results

Stage Results 
Stage One
Laps: 21

Stage Two
Laps: 25

Final Stage Results 

Laps: 61

References 

NASCAR races at Daytona International Speedway
2021 in sports in Florida
NextEra Energy 250
2021 NASCAR Camping World Truck Series